Manu Sareen (born 16 May 1968 in India) is the former Minister for Equality and former Church and Nordic Cooperation, in the Cabinet of Helle Thorning-Schmidt and former  and member of the Copenhagen City Council, elected for the Danish Social Liberal Party.

Life 
Sareen was raised on Amager, where the family moved to from India in 1970.  He is a trained social worker and mediator, he has since 1997 been employed by the Hour Liaison/Ethnic consultant team, and has since 1999 been affiliated with the City of Copenhagen as ethnic consultant. He is also a lecturer and teacher, and has written several books, including a book about forced marriages. In 2006 he debuted as a children's book author, and in 2007 he published the second book in the series about Iqbal Farooq.
Sareen was elected to the Copenhagen City Council in 2002 and was since 2006 Group leader of the Danish Social Liberal Party. At the general election 2005 he was candidate in Vesterbro district, and got second-most votes in the Western constituency. He was thus first alternate to MP Lone Dybkjær. In 2011 he was elected to parliament for the Nørrebro district.
Manu Sareen was nominated for Politician of the Year in 2003, 2006 and 2007 by the National Association for Gays and Lesbians.
On the third of October 2011 he was appointed the first male minister for equality.

Sareen is the first minister of Denmark with a non-European ethnic background.
He is married to Anya Degn Sareen. The couple have three children.

Bibliography 
 When love becomes coercion - generational conflict and forced marriages (2003)
 Iqbal Farooq - and the black pierrot (2006)
 How to avoid dropout AZ (2006)
 Iqbal Farooq - and the crown jewels (2007)
 Iqbal Farooq - and the Indian super chip (2009)
 Clumsy Hassan (2011)

References

External links and sources 
 Manu Sareen website
 
 Vestager overturns gender , 02.10.2011, Ekstra Bladet

Danish Ministers for Ecclesiastical Affairs
Danish Social Liberal Party politicians
Danish agnostics
1967 births
Living people
Danish children's writers
People from Copenhagen
Place of birth missing (living people)
Indian emigrants to Denmark
Members of the Folketing 2011–2015